The 1877 Minnesota gubernatorial election was held on November 6, 1877 to elect the governor of Minnesota. Incumbent John S. Pillsbury was reelected to a second term.

Results

References

1877
Minnesota
gubernatorial
November 1877 events